Death Duel of Kung Fu is 1979 martial art movie, directed by William Cheung Ki and starring John Liu, Don Wong Tao and Eagle Han-ying. It is also known as Showdown of the Master Warriors and Return of the Secret Rivals as an alternate title. With in say, the movie has no relationship with the Secret Rivals trilogy but most of the filming locations took places in South Korea although the story is set in China, which makes the result that it makes a similar storyline as Secret Rivals. It is also Eagle Han-ying`s first Hong Kong movie debut.

Plot
It opens with the top fighter and general Sun Chin Qwei (Don Wong) kills marshall Tao and heads to the Taiwan to join the army however it is later pursued by the lord To Ko Lam (Eagle Han). Qwei escapes and along the way he fell in love with the Japanese girl Keigi who is actually a descent of To Ko Lam but later fall in love with Qwei. Meanwhile, northern kick boxing champion Sun Hsun (John Liu) is giving an Sun Chin Qwei a hard time but later they join forces together to defeat To Ko Lam.

Casts
John Liu as Sun Hsun
Don Wong Tao as Sun Chin Qwei
Eagle Han-ying as To Ko Lam 
Kim Chung Ja as Keigi
Wu Jia Xiang as Marshall Tao (cameo)
Chan Yiu Lam as Ka Yee Kee
Peter Chan as Marshall Tao`s assistant (cameo)
Chung Fat as To Ko Lam`s sword fighter
King Lee Chung as To Ko Lam`s swords fighter
Tang Ti (extra)
Cheung Tin Ho (extra)
Gam Hing Ji (extra)
Chin Yuet Sang (stunts)
Corey Yuen (stunts)
Lam Hak Ming (extra)
Mang Hoi (extra, stunts)

Reception
The movie got positive receptions. IMDb gave 6.4/10 and Amazon.com gave 4.1/5.

Production and impact
The movie was filmed in South Korea. Some of the locations took from the same location from the Secret Rivals. Once again Don Wong and John Liu teamed up together, except this time the villain was replaced to Eagle Han-ying instead of Hwang Jang Lee. Rumors have heard Hwang Jang Lee suppose to return to Don Wong and John Liu however being that Hwang Jang Lee was already working on in Hong Kong for the movies such as Dance of the Drunken Mantis and Hell`s Windstaff for 1979. This results to give a leading villain role for Eagle Han who numerously worked for the low budget movies (such as Bruce Le`s Return of the Red Tiger.) in South Korea. The success of the movie will later give him more villain roles in Godfrey Ho`s movies. Nevertheless, this was John Liu`s last Korean and Hong Kong production film and will later working on Hong Kong industry. Don Wong however will later team up with Eagle Han once again in Quick Step Mantis and Wild Panther.

External links

1979 films
1979 martial arts films
1970s martial arts films
Hong Kong martial arts films
Kung fu films
1970s Hong Kong films